Chutes-de-la-Chaudière or Chutes de la Chaudière may refer to:

 Chutes de la Chaudière (or Chaudière Falls) on the Chaudière River in Lévis, Quebec, Canada
 Chutes de la Chaudière, French name for the Chaudière Falls on the Ottawa River in the centre of the Ottawa-Gatineau metropolitan area in Canada
 Chutes-de-la-Chaudière (electoral district), a Quebec provincial electoral district

See also
Chaudière (disambiguation)
Les Chutes-de-la-Chaudière (disambiguation)
 Lotbinière—Chutes-de-la-Chaudière, a Canadian federal electoral district in Quebec
 Lévis-et-Chutes-de-la-Chaudière, a former Canadian federal electoral district